Morena Assembly constituency is one of the 230 Vidhan Sabha (Legislative Assembly) constituencies of Madhya Pradesh state in central India. This constituency came into existence in 1951, as one of the 79 Vidhan Sabha constituencies of the erstwhile Madhya Bharat state.

Morena (constituency number 6) is one of the six Vidhan Sabha constituencies located in Morena district. This constituency covers the part of Morena tehsil.

Morena is part of Morena Lok Sabha constituency.

Members of Legislative Assembly
As a constituency of Madhya Bharat:
 1951: Shovarn Singh Kansana, Indian National Congress / Karan Singh, Indian National Congress
As a constituency of Madhya Pradesh: 
 1957: Kunwar Yashwantsingh Kushwah (Indian National Congress) & Chameli Bai Sagar (Indian National Congress) 
 1962: Jabar Singh (PSP)
 1967: Jahar Singh (BJS) 
 1972: Maharaj Singh 
 1977: Jabar Singh (JNP)  
 1980: Maharaj Singh Mavai, Indian National Congress (I)
 1985: Jahar Singh Sharma, Bharatiya Janata Party
 1990: Sevaram Gupta, Bharatiya Janata Party
 1993: Sobran Singh Mavai, Indian National Congress
 1998: Sevaram Gupta, Bharatiya Janata Party
 2003: Rustam Singh, Bharatiya Janata Party
 2008: Paras Ram Mudgal, Bahujan Samaj Party
 2013: Rustam Singh, Bharatiya Janata party                  
 2018: Raghuraj Singh Kansana, Indian National Congress
 2020 (by election): Rakesh Mavai, Indian National Congress

See also
 Morena

References

Morena district
Assembly constituencies of Madhya Pradesh